Dudley Devere Manlove (June 11, 1914 – April 17, 1996) was an American radio announcer and an actor. His credits include the San Francisco–based radio detective show Candy Matson, YUkon 2-8209.

Early years 
In 1921, Manlove was one of a group of juvenile performers sponsored by the Oakland Tribune. Also in 1921, at age 6, he received a contract from the Stewart Motion Picture Company. At that time, he already had more than a year's experience on stage.

Radio 
Manlove worked on radio station KLX in Oakland, California, acting on the Eight o'Clock Players and the Faucit Theater of the Air. He also was host of The Musical Clock morning program on KYA in San Francisco.

Manlove's voice was his trademark as a radio announcer and actor.

Film and television 
Manlove is known for his roles in the science fiction B movies The Creation of the Humanoids and Plan 9 from Outer Space. Writing for Film Threat, critic Josiah Teal described Manlove's performance in Plan 9 as "over the top," with critic James Berardinelli writing that Manlove's acting in the film was "lacking." 

Manlove also had multiple guest-starring roles in the television series Dragnet and Alfred Hitchcock Presents.

Personal life 
On September 20, 1940, Manlove and his wife, Ora, married in Reno. She sued him for divorce on February 8, 1945. In 1947, he married singer Patricia Prichard in Santa Clara, California. They divorced in 1954.

Death 
On April 17, 1996, Manlove died in San Bernardino, California, of cirrhosis of the liver at the age of 81.

Radio

Filmography

References

External links
 

American male film actors
American radio personalities
American male television actors
1914 births
1996 deaths
People from Alameda County, California
Male actors from California
20th-century American male actors
Deaths from cirrhosis